Schinia deserticola is a moth of the family Noctuidae. It is found from southern California to southeastern Arizona and north to west central Utah and southeastern Oregon.

It was formerly considered a subspecies of Schinia cupes.

The wingspan is 22–28 mm.

The larvae feed on Camissonia claviformis.

External links
Images
Butterflies and Moths of North America
Systematics of Schinia cupes (Grote) complex: Revised status of Schinia crotchii (Hy. Edwards) (Lepidoptera: Noctuidae: Heliothinae)

Schinia
Moths of North America
Taxa named by William Barnes (entomologist)
Taxa named by James Halliday McDunnough
Moths described in 1916